Apomastus schlingeri (misnomer Aptostichus schlingeri) is a species of venomous spiders belonging to a family of trapdoor spiders. They produce a complex of neurotoxins called aptotoxins.  Both known species of the genus are found in the United States.

Venom

Apomastus schlingeri have a venom that is highly neurotoxic in effect. The neurotoxin is actually a complex of proteins called aptotoxins (Aps for short), which in turn belong to a group of neurotoxins called cyrtautoxins. There are at least nine different peptides, and most of them are directly paralytic and lethal to insect larvae. All of the peptides are voltage-gated sodium channel blockers. To date, Aps III is known to be the most potent peptide of all.

References

External links
Taxonomy at UniProt
NCBI Taxonomy Browser
Taxonomy at ITIS Report
Animal Diversity Web
Venom information at ArchnoSpider
Taxonomy at The Taxonomicon
Comparative Taxinogenomics Database
Global Species
Taxon profile at BioLib

Euctenizidae
Spiders of the United States
Spiders described in 2002